A list of films produced in Hong Kong in 2002:.

2002

References

External links
 IMDB list of Hong Kong films
 Hong Kong films of 2002 at HKcinemamagic.com

2002
2002 in Hong Kong
Hong Kong